Brookfield Zoo, also known as the Chicago Zoological Park, is a zoo located in the Chicago suburb of Brookfield, Illinois. It opened on July 1, 1934, and quickly gained international recognition for using moats and ditches instead of cages to separate animals from visitors and from other animals. The zoo was also the first in America to exhibit giant pandas, one of which (Su Lin) has been taxidermied and put on display in Chicago's Field Museum of Natural History. In 1960, Brookfield Zoo built the nation's first fully indoor dolphin exhibit, and in the 1980s, the zoo introduced Tropic World, the first fully indoor rainforest simulation and the then-largest indoor zoo exhibit in the world.

The Brookfield Zoo is owned by the Cook County Forest Preserve District and managed by the Chicago Zoological Society.  The society sponsors numerous research and conservation efforts globally.

History

In 1919, Edith Rockefeller McCormick donated land she had received from her father as a wedding gift to the Cook County Forest Preserve District for development as a zoological garden.  The district added  to that plot and in 1921, the Chicago Zoological Society was established.  Serious construction did not begin until 1926, after a zoo tax was approved.  Construction slowed during the Great Depression, but regained momentum by late 1931. Construction went on at an increased pace and the zoo opened on July 1, 1934. By the end of September 1934, over one million people had visited the new zoo; the four millionth visitor was just two years later.

The 1950s saw the addition of a veterinary hospital, a children's zoo, and the famous central fountain. The zoo went through a decline in the 1960s until a large bond issue from the Forest Preserve District, close attention to zoo governance, and visitor services saw the zoo recreate itself as one of the nation's best. Tropic World, the then-largest indoor zoo exhibit in the world, was designed by French architect Pierre Venoa and opened in three phases (Africa, Asia, and South America) between 1982 and 1984.

During the zoo's early decades, a narrow-gauge railroad existed, which carried guests around the outer perimeter of the park from the North Gate to the old Seven Seas dolphin habitat on the park's south end. Bison lived on a small prairie on the west end of the park and could only been seen from the train, reminiscent of the Old West.  The railroad was dismantled in the mid-1980s, although the pathways once used by the train still exist as roads for service vehicles, as does the North Gate station (since converted into a snack stand)

In the early 21st century, the zoo has undergone significant capital upgrades, constructing the Hamill Family Play Zoo, Regenstein Wolf Woods, butterfly tent, sheltered group catering pavilions, and the largest non-restored, hand-carved, wooden carousel in the United States.  Great Bear Wilderness, a new, $27.3 million sprawling exhibit for grizzly and polar bears, opened in 2010.  The interiors of several existing buildings were reconfigured into immersion exhibits, based upon ecosystems rather than by clades; these include the Living Coast (the shores of Chile and Peru), the Swamp, the Clouded Leopard Rain Forest, Desert's Edge, the African Savanna and Forest, and Australia House.

The zoo's reptile house, the first building to open in 1934, closed in 2005 and was converted into the Mary Ann McLean Conservation Leadership Center which does not display live animals, but it details the zoo's larger conservation mission.
Because of the expense of constructing Great Bear Wilderness and protests from In Defense of Animals over the deaths of the zoo's African elephants, the Pachyderm House was closed for a year in 2011 for modifications and no longer exhibits elephants or river hippopotamuses. 

The Children's Zoo, which opened in August 1953, was dismantled in early 2013, and a new family-based series of exhibits known as Wild Encounters opened on the site on July 1, 2015, which features a red panda, a herd of reindeer, 2 Llamas, Bennet's wallabies, 22 Nigerian dwarf goats, and a free-flight parakeet aviary.

The Pachyderm building also has a pygmy hippo named 'Banana' who arrived at the zoo in May 2022 after an old female hippo passed away in June 2021.

The Brookfield Zoo is also known for its majestic fountain named after the 26th president of the United States, Theodore Roosevelt. On some days, the fountain's spouting water can reach up to 60 feet high.

The zoo has been closed only five times in its history: On September 14, 2008, after damage from a weekend rainstorm; on February 2, 2011, after a major blizzard; on April 18–19, 2013, after flooding from a severe rainstorm; January 30–31, 2019, due to below-freezing temperatures; and from March 19 to July 1, 2020, due to the COVID-19 pandemic.

Notable animals (past and present)
Ziggy was a 6.5 ton male Asian elephant
Binti Jua is a female western lowland gorilla
Cookie, a Major Mitchell's cockatoo, had been part of the zoo's collection since the opening in 1934 until his death in 2016.

Animal list

Australia House

Big Cats

Clouded Leopard Rain Forest

Desert's Edge

Feather & Scales

Free Flight Room

Frogs & Reptiles

Great Bear Wilderness

Habitat Africa! The Forest

Habitat Africa! The Savannah

Habitat Africa! (The Savannah) Kopje Free Flight Aviary

Hamill Family Play Zoo

Hamill Family Wild Encounters

Hoofed Animals

(The) Living Coast

Pachyderm House

Pinniped Point 
 California sea lion
 Gray seal

Regenstein Wolf Woods 
 Mexican gray wolf

Seven Seas 
 Atlantic bottlenose dolphins

(The) Swamp

Tropic World

Other Animals 
 American white pelican
 Desert tortoise
 Domestic guineafowl
 Glass bloodfin tetra
 Indian peafowl
 Neon tetra
 Radiated tortoise
 Serpae tetra
 Trumpeter swan
 White stork

Butterfly House
(species list tbc)

Former Holdings

Xtreme BUGS! (2012)

Dinosaurs Alive!, Series 1 (2009) 
 Allosaurus
 Apatosaurus
 Baryonyx
 Deinonychus
 Dilophosaurus
 Huanghetitan
 Metriacanthosaurus
 Omeisaurus
 Parasaurolophus
 Protoceratops
 Pteranodon
 Stegosaurus
 Triceratops
 Tyrannosaurus rex
 Yangchuanosaurus

Dinosaurs Alive!, Series 2 (2013) 
 Alxasaurus
 Amargasaurus
 Carnotaurus
 Confuciusornis
 Dyoplosaurus
 Gigantoraptor
 Kosmoceratops
 Microraptor
 Olorotitan
 Pachycephalosaurus
 Shantungosaurus
 Sinosauropteryx
 Spinosaurus
 Styracosaurus
 Tuojiangosaurus
 Velociraptor

Dinosaurs Alive!, Series 3 (2017) 
 Ankylosaurus
 Dracorex hogwartsia
 Megalosaurus
 Quetzalcoatlus
 Utahraptor

Dinosaurs Alive!, Series 4 (2020) 
 Argentinosaurus
 Azhdarcho
 Cryolophosaurus
 Datousaurus
 Gallimimus
 Maiasaura
 Majungasaurus
 Pentaceratops
 Rapetosaurus
 Shunosaurus
 Tarchia
 Tenontosaurus
 Troodon

Dinosaurs Alive!, Series 5 (2021) 
 Brachiosaurus

Dragons! (2017)

Ice Age Giants! (2022)

Notable staff
Chicago cartoonist John T. McCutcheon was the president of the Chicago Zoological Society from 1921 until 1948 and oversaw the zoo's construction, opening and its early years, including helping it through the war years, when the zoo saw a decrease in attendance.

Grace Olive Wiley briefly worked as a reptile curator at the zoo in 1935.

George B. Rabb was the director of Brookfield Zoo from 1976 until 2003, having originally worked as a researcher and an assistant to the director.

Conservation programs 
 The Brookfield Zoo has a conservation project in Punta San Juan, Peru. Disney World partnered with the zoo by giving a $25,000 grant assigned specifically to the work in Punta San Juan, Peru, which helped the Chicago Zoological Society conservationists gain clearance into the highly restricted and protected area. The CZS has hired multiple people that already worked for the reserve to help build a conservation research team. Samples are taken from wildlife such as South American sea lions, Inca terns, Peruvian boobys, Guanay cormorants, and the endangered Humboldt penguins. The team uses the information they gathered to research the environment, observe the species, and monitor populations. Project results further knowledge about the ocean and help save endangered species. Team members also continuously have groups of children, of varying ages, go out to clean up garbage that accumulates on the beaches of Punta San Juan from the Pacific Ocean.

Economics 
In 2014, revenue of the Brookfield Zoo was made up by $26.6 million from admissions and guest services, $15.2 million from taxes, $11.5 million from membership dues, $11.5 million from contributions, sponsorships, and net assets released, and $1.2 million from investments and other income. Expenses in 2014 included $15.7 million for admissions and guest services, $15 million for animal collections and conservation programs, $10.7 million for care of buildings and grounds, $7.9 million for management and general, $5.9 million for public education and communications, $3.8 million for marketing and public relations, $3.4 million for fundraising, and $1.4 million for membership. Revenue totaled $66 million and spending totaled $63.8 million during 2014.

In 2010, Governor Pat Quinn granted the Brookfield Zoo $15.6 million to aid repairing and remodeling many parts of the zoo. This included updating the north entrance to the zoo on 31st Street and Golfview Avenue.

The CZS has hosted several fundraising events, Wines in the Wild and Wild Wild Whirl, where they collected various donations ranging in totals from $130,000 to $1.5 million.

A total of 808 volunteers help the zoo with 74,401 community service hours which equates to $1.86 million of work.

Economic movement approaches $150 million, 2,000 jobs, 580 volunteers, and 2.2 million visitors every year.

Gallery

Notes

External links 

Zoos in Illinois
Parks in Cook County, Illinois
Brookfield, Illinois
Buildings and structures in Cook County, Illinois
1934 establishments in Illinois
Tourist attractions in Cook County, Illinois
Zoos established in 1934